Evaristo Avalos (born 24 December 1933) is a Mexican equestrian. He competed in two events at the 1968 Summer Olympics.

References

1933 births
Living people
Mexican male equestrians
Olympic equestrians of Mexico
Equestrians at the 1968 Summer Olympics